Brian Ezequiel Alferez (born 4 April 1998) is an Argentine professional footballer who plays as a centre-back for Ciudad de Bolívar, on loan from Gimnasia Mendoza.

Career
Alferez joined Godoy Cruz's youth system in 2012. Six years later, in January 2018, Alferez made his professional debut in a 1–0 Primera División win over Chacarita Juniors. 

On 14 June 2019, Alferez agreed a loan move to Primera B Nacional's Gimnasia y Esgrima for the 2019–20 campaign. He made fifteen appearances in total for Gimnasia, prior to returning to Godoy on 30 June 2020. Days later, on 2 July, Alferez revealed that a return to Mendoza on a fresh loan deal was nearing completion. He ended up re-joining the club in August 2020 on a permanently deal. In October 2021, Alferez suffered an anterior cruciate ligament injury in a friendly game against his former club, Godoy Cruz, which kept him out for nearly 10 months. In February 2022, Alferez joined Ciudad de Bolívar on loan until the end of 2022.

Career statistics
.

References

External links

1998 births
Living people
Sportspeople from Mendoza Province
Argentine footballers
Association football defenders
Argentine Primera División players
Primera Nacional players
Godoy Cruz Antonio Tomba footballers
Gimnasia y Esgrima de Mendoza footballers